Alin Alexandru Firfirică (born 3 November 1995) is a Romanian athlete specialising in the discus throw. In 2015 he won a gold medal at the 2015 European U23 Championships. Later he won silver medals at the 2017 European U23 Championships and 2017 Summer Universiade.

His personal best in the event is 67.32 metres set in Chorzów in 2019.

International competitions

References

1995 births
Living people
Romanian male discus throwers
Universiade silver medalists for Romania
Universiade medalists in athletics (track and field)
Medalists at the 2017 Summer Universiade
Medalists at the 2019 Summer Universiade
Athletes (track and field) at the 2020 Summer Olympics
Olympic athletes of Romania